Raihman v. Latvia (Communication No. 1621/2007) was a case decided by the United Nations Human Rights Committee in 2010 (UN Document CCPR/C/100/D/1621/2007).

Facts and proceedings

Mr. Raihman, a Latvian national and member of Jewish and Russian-speaking minorities, was born in 1959. His name and surname were registered as "Леонид Райхман" by USSR authorities, and used until 1998, when he received a Latvian non-citizen's passport with the name and surname amended to "Leonīds Raihmans", with the ending -s required for most masculine names in Latvian.

In 2004, he applied to the State Language Centre to have his name and surname spelled as Leonid Raihman. The applications was rejected, as were the appeals before Latvian courts.

In 2007, Raihman has filed a complaint before HRC, being represented by Latvian Human Rights Committee co-chairman A. Dimitrovs.

HRC views

The Committee found that 

Therefore, the Committee did not consider it necessary, to evaluate the case under articles 26 (non-discrimination), 27 (minority rights) and 2 in conjunction with 17, to which Raihman had referred (para. 8.4.).

Two members of the HRC, Krister Thelin and Rafael Rivas Posada, submitted a dissent, seeing no violation of ICCPR in the case.

Aftermath

Mr. Raihman had applied for the court to review his case due to HRC views. The Supreme Court of Latvia decided that the views are a ground to review the case in the executive, in the specific case — in the State Language Centre. Mr. Raihman has gone through court proceedings again; in 2017, the Supreme Court refused to record his name in documents without Latvian endings.

In 2012, the government of Latvia has responded to the Committee that is "sees no need for an immediate action to amend the existing national regulation of writing personal names in official documents. At the same time, the Government will take into account the opinion of the Committee in the possible further discussions on that issue on national level".

The views in Raihman v. Latvia case have been referenced by the UN Human Rights Committee in a later case of Bulgakov v. Ukraine.

References

External links
HRC views (if unavailable, can also be accessed at LHRC website)

Privacy law
Public records
United Nations Human Rights Committee case law
Human rights abuses in Latvia
Language case law
2010 in case law
2010 in Latvia
Jewish Latvian history
Russians in Latvia